Young Dr. Kildare is a syndicated medical drama television series which originally ran from September 21, 1972, for a total of 24 episodes. It was a remake of the Richard Chamberlain series Dr. Kildare which in turn was based on fictional doctor characters originally created by author Max Brand in the 1930s and previously used by MGM in a popular film series and radio drama.

Plot 
The series centers on young intern Dr. James Kildare (Mark Jenkins) working at the fictional large metropolitan "Blair General Hospital" and trying to learn his profession, deal with patients' problems, and win the respect of the senior Dr. Leonard Gillespie (Gary Merrill).

Cast

Main cast
 Mark Jenkins as Dr. James Kildare
 Gary Merrill as Dr. Leonard Gillespie
 Marsha Mason as Nurse Lord
 Simon Oakland as Attorney

Guest cast
Guest cast includes: Don Johnson, Cass Elliot, William Devane, Pamelyn Ferdin, Pamela Payton-Wright, Jess Walton, Marcia Rodd, and Claiborne Cary

Episodes
The 24 episodes in the series are:

 The Night of the Intern
 The Stranger
 The Exile
 I'm Handling It
 The Unfinished Child
 The Thing with Feathers
 The Cage
 The Riot
 The Don
 The House Call
 By This Sign
 No More than a Bad Cold
 Deaf Heart
 Chemistry of Anger
 Charlotte Wade Makes Lots of Shade
 Death of Innocents
 A Perfectly Healthy Boy
 The Legacy
 The Three of Us
 The Million Dollar Property
 The Man Is a Rock
 The Accident
 The Nature of the Beast
 A Good Death

References

External links

1972 American television series debuts
1973 American television series endings
1970s American drama television series
Prequel television series
1970s American medical television series
English-language television shows
Television series by MGM Television
Television series based on adaptations